Riddell Sports Group is an American company specializing in sports equipment for American football. It was headquartered in Rosemont, Illinois. In 2017, the company relocated to a new facility in adjacent Des Plaines, Illinois.

The company was started by John Tate Riddell. He first invented the removable cleat, and then went on to invent the first ever plastic suspension helmet in 1939. In 2008, Dan Arment was appointed president of Riddell. Arment previously worked as executive vice-president and general manager of mass-market business for BRG Sports, Riddell's parent company, which is owned by private equity firm Fenway Partners.  Fenway acquired the company in 2003 from Lincolnshire Management. In 2008, Riddell sued competitor Schutt Sports. Two years later, Schutt filed a lawsuit, also for patent-infringement, against Riddell. Riddell ended up winning, leading to Schutt filing for bankruptcy.

Products 

Riddell is widely known for its line of football helmets. In 2002, Riddell released a new helmet design called the Revolution or "Revo" for short The newer design was released in response to a study on concussions. The design became popular in the NFL and NCAA, being used by notables such as Peyton Manning, Dwight Freeney, Casey Hampton, and Brady Quinn, as well as having been used by Eli Manning during the 2005 season.

Riddell is also known for its Revolution IQ HITS helmet (Head Impact Telemetry System). The sensors inside the helmet called MX Encoders store data from each impact and can be transferred to a laptop to be reviewed by coaching staff or physicians. The helmets cost about $999 and are already being used by NCAA football teams.

Other helmet styles produced by Riddell include the Revolution Speed and the Revolution IQ. The company also produces a youth line of helmets including the Revolution Speed Youth, Revolution IQ Youth, Revolution Youth, Revolution Little Pro, Attack, VSR-4, VSR2-Y, and Little Pro.

Lawsuits 
A jury in the 2013 case ruled that Riddell was negligent in not warning people about concussion dangers when wearing its helmets. The exact verdict in favor of Mr. Ridolfi was on his claims for negligent failure to warn. Attorney Franklin D. Azar, who represented plaintiffs in the Colorado case, predicted that the $11 million verdict awarded in the 2013 trial could have implications for the larger suit by NFL players, because Riddell knew in November 2000 of problems in testing of the helmets but did not disclose the information.  Azar asserted that the verdict shows that there is no statute of limitations on traumatic brain injuries when manufacturers do not adequately warn of defects. The ruling came as Riddell faced a similar suit in California, as well as a complaint by thousands of NFL players. 

Riddell has been sued by multiple NFL players. More than 125 former NFL players sued the league and helmet-maker Riddell for not disclosing and, in some instances, allegedly hiding the risks of repeated head injuries. There are "at least three" personal injury cases pending in California and one more in Pennsylvania. According to the AP, the cases represent the "first examples of former players joining together to file concussion-related lawsuits against the NFL."

Lawyer Thomas Girardi represents dozens of the players in two of the complaints. He says the goal is to enact "necessary changes" to protect future generations of players, as well as "set[ting] up a medical process so [the plaintiffs] can have medical attention for this injury as long as they need it", in addition to financial compensation.

The NFL alleged that players knew the risks when they made football their career and that there was "no misconduct or liability" on the league's part. Players intended to show there was "a history of literature showing that multiple blows to the head can cause long-term damage" that got buried by the NFL and that the league also "fraudulently concealed the long-term effects of concussions," including the increased risk of dementia.

The players appeared to have allies in Washington. A Senate subcommittee held hearings on misleading safety claims made by sports equipment companies. One thing is certain: it's going to be a long slog for both sides, without a clear endgame. For example, the players are seeking judgments "in the millions of dollars," though no specific numbers have been listed in the court documents. The consensus from lawyers on both sides is that the lawsuits could take years to be sorted out. Nobody associated with the players, the league, or Riddell was even "willing to guess how long it could be" during discussions with the AP.

See also
 Schutt Sports

References

External links

 

Sportswear brands
Private equity portfolio companies
Privately held companies based in Illinois
Sporting goods manufacturers of the United States
Companies based in Cook County, Illinois
Manufacturing companies based in Illinois
Des Plaines, Illinois
Manufacturing companies established in 1927
American companies established in 1927